Nakhon Pathom Hospital is the main public hospital of Nakhon Pathom Province, Thailand and is classified under the Ministry of Public Health as a regional hospital. It is an affiliated teaching hospital of the Faculty of Medicine Siriraj Hospital, Mahidol University.

History 
Initially, the first hospital in Nakhon Pathom was under the management of the Department of Medical Services of the Ministry of Public Health, known as Nakhon Pathom City Hospital. It opened in 1952 and was located on Lang Phra Road in a crowded community. Since space was very limited, expansion was made very difficult. Therefore in 1962, Phon Wongsaroj, the governor of Nakhon Pathom decided to move the hospital to a better and more spacious location on Tesa Road. Construction was completed in 1966 and Nakhon Pathom Hospital was officially opened on 11 March 1966 by Prime Minister Thanom Kittikachorn.

See also 
 Healthcare in Thailand
 Hospitals in Thailand
 List of hospitals in Thailand

References 

 Article incorporates material from the corresponding article in the Thai Wikipedia.

Hospitals in Thailand
Nakhon Pathom province